This is a list of villages and settlements in Imo State, Nigeria organised by local government area (LGA) and district/area (with postal codes also given). Villages in Eziama Obaire are Umuakuma Nduhu na Ogbo Ezemenaha Umuduru Ndimbara Ezekwemba Umunaa Umunnowai Umunam Umuokwa Umuwokwe Umuenyi Umuezealaobi Umueze

By postal code